"Helicopter" is a track by Dutch DJ and record producer Martin Garrix and Dutch music producing duo Firebeatz. It was released as a digital download on 17 February 2014 on Beatport and on 10 March 2014 on iTunes. The track has charted in Belgium, France and the Netherlands. The track was produced by Martin Garrix and Firebeatz.

Chart performance

Weekly charts

Release history

References

2014 singles
Martin Garrix songs
2014 songs
Spinnin' Records singles
Songs written by Martin Garrix